Lapthorn is a surname. Notable people with the surname include:

Enid Lapthorn (1889–1967), British politician
Katherine Lapthorn, Dutch member of Kayak (band)

See also
Ratsey and Lapthorn, British company of sail making
Lapthorne